Borgella is a monotypic genus of bryozoans belonging to the family Cerioporidae. The only species is Borgella pustulosa.

The species is found in New Zealand.

References

Cyclostomatida
Bryozoan genera
Monotypic bryozoan genera